Andrew Brown Raisbeck (10 April 1881 – 23 October 1958) was a Scottish professional footballer of the early 1900s who played for clubs including Hibernian and Hull City.

Career
Born in Slamannan (then in Stirlingshire) but raised in a mining community near Cambuslang in South Lanarkshire, Raisback began his football career as a teenager with Larkhall Thistle, alongside elder brothers Bill (later of Clyde, Sunderland and Falkirk) and Alex (later captain of Liverpool, Partick Thistle and Scotland).

In 1900 he followed the route into the professional level taken by Alex and joined Hibernian, making 11 Scottish Football League appearances for the side which finished 3rd in the table. The following year he joined Dundee but did not make a league appearance, spending the end of the campaign with Queens Park Rangers in England. Ultimately, however, he next signed for Liverpool where his brother Alex was already an established player. He spent two years with the Anfield club but never appeared for the first team.

In 1904, he transferred to the newly formed Hull City. They did not play in official competitions in their first year, but their many friendlies included a home meeting with Liverpool which the visitors won 6–2. Over the next two campaigns in the Football League Second Division, Raisbeck made 47 league appearances and scored 5 goals, including one in a 4–0 victory over West Bromwich Albion.

Personal life
In 1907, Raisbeck decided to leave Hull City and emigrate to a new life in Canada, accompanied by many of his family members including his footballing brother Bill. He died in 1958 in British Columbia.

In addition to the three brothers, their cousin Luke Raisbeck was also a footballer who played for several clubs including West Ham United and Blackpool.

References

1881 births
1958 deaths
Scottish footballers
Association football midfielders
Sportspeople from Cambuslang
Footballers from Falkirk (council area)
Larkhall Thistle F.C. players
Hibernian F.C. players
Dundee F.C. players
Queens Park Rangers F.C. players
Liverpool F.C. players
Hull City A.F.C. players
Scottish Junior Football Association players
English Football League players
Scottish Football League players
Scottish emigrants to Canada
Footballers from South Lanarkshire